Jean Frederick "Frank" Rigaldi (11 October 1893 – 1 December 1970) was a former Australian rules footballer who played with Carlton and Richmond in the Victorian Football League (VFL).

Career 

Notes

External links 
		
Frank Rigaldi's profile at Blueseum		

1893 births
1970 deaths
Carlton Football Club players
Richmond Football Club players
Hawthorn Football Club (VFA) players
Williamstown Football Club players
Australian rules footballers from Melbourne
People from East Melbourne